Adam Maher (born 20 July 1993) is a Dutch professional footballer who plays for Saudi Professional League club Damac as a midfielder.

Club career

Maher made his professional debut for AZ on 15 December 2010 in a 2010–11 UEFA Europa League game against FC BATE Borisov and scored a goal on his debut. He was the youngest player playing for a Dutch football club ever to score a goal in the Europa League and UEFA Cup. When AZ won the 2013 KNVB Cup Final Maher scored the first goal as they defeated PSV Eindhoven 2–1.

On 1 July 2013, Adam Maher moved to PSV for a fee of €6.5 million. He signed a five-year contract and was one of 5 players that PSV signed.

Maher returned to AZ in the 2018/2019 season, before joining FC Utrecht in the summer of 2019.

On 11 July 2022, FC Utrecht announced the departure of Maher to Damac FC on a permanent transfer.

International career
Maher was a member of the Netherlands squad for the 2009 FIFA U-17 World Cup. In February 2012 Adam Maher was called at the preselection of the Dutch team by Bert van Marwijk. On 7 May 2012, he was named in the provisional list of 36 players for the Euro 2012 tournament, one of nine uncapped players to be chosen by Netherlands manager Bert van Marwijk as part of the preliminary squad, but eventually did not make the final cut. He made his debut for the Netherlands in a friendly match against Bayern Munich. On 15 August 2012, Maher earned his first official cap under new manager Louis van Gaal in the 4–2 loss against Belgium in a friendly match.

Career statistics

International

Honours
AZ
KNVB Cup: 2012–13

PSV
Eredivisie: 2014–15, 2015–16
Johan Cruijff Shield: 2015, 2016

Individual
Johan Cruijff Trophy: 2011–12
 Eredivisie Player of the Month: October 2019

References

External links

 Adam Maher at Voetbal International 
 

1993 births
Living people
People from Diemen
People from Drâa-Tafilalet
Dutch footballers
Moroccan footballers
Association football midfielders
AZ Alkmaar players
PSV Eindhoven players
Jong PSV players
FC Twente players
FC Utrecht players
Damac FC players
Ankaraspor footballers
Eredivisie players
Eerste Divisie players
Süper Lig players
Saudi Professional League players
Netherlands youth international footballers
Netherlands under-21 international footballers
Netherlands international footballers
Dutch expatriate footballers
Expatriate footballers in Turkey
Expatriate footballers in Saudi Arabia
Dutch expatriate sportspeople in Saudi Arabia
Moroccan emigrants to the Netherlands
Footballers from North Holland